12 × 5 is the second American studio album by the English rock band the Rolling Stones, released in 1964 following the success of their American debut The Rolling Stones (England's Newest Hit Makers), is an expanded version of the EP Five by Five, which had followed their debut album in the UK.

The five songs on the British EP were fleshed out with seven additional tracks to bring the work to LP length. Among the additional tracks were the UK single-only release "It's All Over Now", a cover of a Bobby Womack song that was the group's first UK number one hit, an alternative version of "Time Is on My Side", which appears in a more familiar form on other albums, and three Jagger/Richards originals.

Composition
The album, like its predecessor, largely features R&B covers. However, it also contains three compositions by the developing Mick Jagger/Keith Richards songwriting team, as well as two group compositions under the pseudonym "Nanker Phelge". 12 × 5 is notable for featuring the first, and less often heard, of the Stones' two versions of Jerry Ragovoy's "Time Is on My Side", with a prominent electronic organ instead of the better-known version's electric guitar.

"I loved everything about this album as a kid," recalled Joe Satriani. "It was those second-generation electric blues players that I loved, but I had no idea where they got that music from. It took my teenage years to discover that."

After sessions in Chicago in June 1964, the Stones' UK label Decca Records released the five-song EP Five by Five. Because EPs were never a lucrative format in the US, London Records – their American distributor at the time – spread its songs across an album, adding seven new recordings to create a release of 12 songs by five musicians, hence the album's title. The rest of the songs were singles "It's All Over Now" and "Time Is on My Side" with their B-sides, plus three that were later included on The Rolling Stones No. 2. Decca would use the same cover (minus the lettering) for the band's second UK album, The Rolling Stones No. 2, in early 1965.

Critical reception 

The album was included in Robert Christgau's "Basic Record Library" of 1950s and 1960s recordings, published in Christgau's Record Guide: Rock Albums of the Seventies (1981).

Remastered version
In August 2002, 12 × 5 was reissued in a new remastered CD and SACD digipak by ABKCO Records. This edition includes stereo versions of "Around and Around", "Confessin' the Blues", "Empty Heart", "It's All Over Now", an extended version of "2120 South Michigan Avenue", and "If You Need Me".

Track listing

Note
The 2002 CD edition features an extended version of "2120 South Michigan Avenue", at 3:41.  The marked tracks are in true stereo on a rare later issue UK Decca EP and on the ABKCO 2002 CD.

Personnel

The Rolling Stones
Mick Jagger – lead vocals, harmonica, güiro
Keith Richards – acoustic and electric guitar, backing vocals
Brian Jones – electric and acoustic guitar, harmonica, tambourine, maracas, organ on "If You Need Me", backing vocals
Charlie Watts – drums
Bill Wyman – bass guitar, backing vocals, triangle

Additional musicians
Ian Stewart – piano, organ

Charts

Certifications

References

External links
 

1964 albums
ABKCO Records albums
Albums produced by Andrew Loog Oldham
London Records albums
The Rolling Stones albums